Es Lizuan Zahid Amir (born 5 November 1983, in Kangar, Perlis) is a Malaysian professional football player currently playing for Sime Darby FC in the Malaysian Super League as a defender.

He previously playing for Sabah and Melaka TMFC before returning Perlis after three year playing for others team.

References

Malaysian footballers
Living people
1983 births
Sabah F.C. (Malaysia) players
Perlis FA players
People from Perak
Footballers at the 2006 Asian Games

Association football fullbacks
Asian Games competitors for Malaysia